Colanic acid is an exopolysaccharide synthesized by the bacteria Enterobacteriaceae. It is produced as a chemical defense to protect the cell surface, and it assists in the formation of biofilms.

Structure 
Colanic acid is composed of polyanionic heteropolysaccharides with hexasaccharide repeating units, consisting of glucose, fucose, galactose, and glucuronic acid. It also consists of O-acetyl groups and pyruvate side chains around these sugar molecules. It forms a protective capsule around cells, primarily Enterobacteriaceae. Colanic acid is highly viscous and has strong acidic properties due to its relatively high mobility. It is considered mildly toxic when injected intraperitoneally in mice, and, its effect on mammals can be compared to the effects of small doses of endotoxin, which can cause diarrhea and malaise.

When a strain of E. coli was observed on a neo-peptone agar by Pierre Fredericq, it initially appeared as translucent colonies around 3-4 mm in diameter. Shortly after, single opaque colonies began to form and produced more colicine than that of the parent. Over time, another variant formed where the colonies are now 5-6 mm in diameter and appear to be more glistening, opaque, and mucoid than the previous strain. These strains are said to be colicinogenic. They are also observed as amorphous, white, and fibrous substances that are water-soluble as well as dilute in salt solutions.

Function 
The main function of colanic acid is to form a slimy capsule around the cell surface under stressful conditions to increase its chances of survival when stressful environmental stimuli arise. The stressful environment can come in the forms of desiccation, oxidative stress, and a low pH. Expression of colanic acid in E. coli has been shown to be required for the creation of normal E. coli biofilm architecture. E. coli secretes heteropolysaccharide colanic acid which forms a slimy capsule surrounding the cell surface under stressful conditions.

Synthesis of colanic acid is up-regulated in biofilms. Acetylation plays a crucial role in modulating structural conformation Physical and chemical properties. Colanic acid, plays an essential role in biofilm formation, in Escherichia coli. Colanic acid does not enhance bacterial adhesion but it blocks the establishment of binding specificity.

Environmental factors

Temperature and pH 
Colanic acid begins to accumulate and synthesize at 19 °C. Nutrients modulate the production of colanic acid with maximal production occurring when glucose and proline are used as carbon and nitrogen sources. E. coli is a type of Enterobacteriaceae that is commonly used to study the conditions and effects of colanic acid production. A study showed that E. coli K92 is able to produce colanic acid at temperatures ranging from 19 °C to 42 °C, but it predominates at around 20 °C.

Colanic acid is typically produced at a low pH. A study was conducted to see just how low of a pH E.coli could withstand. It was concluded that the production of colanic acid can range from a pH of 2 to a pH of 8; with initial acid adaptation at a pH of 5.5.

Colanic acid production in E. coli is dependent on both lipopolysaccharide structure and glucose availability, because important nucleotide-sugar precursors are needed and provided by both.

Activation and regulation

Activation 
2 positive protein regulators are regulated by the RcsA and RcsB genes. These two genes go hand-in-hand as RcsA cannot be activated without RcsB. The activation of colanic acid is due to an initial response to an environmental stimulus such as osmotic shock. This stimulus is relayed to MdoH which is tied to the biosynthesis of MDOs. Unstable MDO levels due to changes within the environment, triggers the RcsC sensor to directly or indirectly relay the signal to the RcsB gene, which is a main activator of cps expression. The RcsA gene activates its own expression.

Regulation 
The cps colanic acid operon can control the biosynthesis of colanic acid. It is composed of one large transcriptional unit that contains a ugd gene right outside the cps operon. It has been shown that the transcriptional antiterminator rfaH promotes said cps transcription synthesis. It does by mediating the cps operon and promoting ugd expression.

A study was conducted to test whether RfaH was able to enhance cps colanic acid transcription for colanic acid production, E. coli K92 wild-type and rfaH mutant strains were grown in Asn and glucose media at 37 °C and analyzed after 120 h of growth. At this temperature, it was observed that the deletion of rfaH had dramatically decreased colanic acid production in both media.

References 

Escherichia coli
Polysaccharides